The 2012 Omloop Het Nieuwsblad took place on 25 February 2012. It was the 67th edition of the international classic Omloop Het Nieuwsblad. This year's Omloop started and ended at St. Peter's Square in Ghent, Belgium and spanned  in the province of East Flanders. The race was the first 1.HC event in the 2012 UCI Europe Tour.

The race was won by Belgium's Sep Vanmarcke of the  team, taking his first professional victory in a three-man sprint finish in Ghent. Vanmarcke out-sprinted 's Tom Boonen and 's Juan Antonio Flecha, the 2010 winner, to the line.

Teams 
As this was a UCI 1.HC event, the organizers, the Flanders Classics Federation, were allowed to invite UCI ProTeams (maximum 70% of the total field), UCI Professional Continental teams, and UCI Continental teams.

Non ProTeams teams are indicated by an asterisk below. Each of the 25 teams were permitted up to eight riders, for a total of 196 riders.

*

*
*

*
*

*

*

*
*
*
*

*

*
*

Pre-race favourites
Pre-race favourites included:
 – 2005 UCI World Road Race Champion, 3 time Paris–Roubaix Champion, 2 time Tour of Flanders Champion
 – 2 time Giro di Lombardia Champion, 2010 Amstel Gold Race Champion, 2 time Omloop Het Nieuwsblad Champion
 – 2010 Omloop Het Nieuwsblad Champion, 2011 Omloop Het Nieuwsblad Runner-up

Results

References

2012
Omloop Het Nieuwsblad
Omloop
Omloop Het Nieuwsblad